Joseph Andrew Motzko (born March 14, 1980) is an American former professional ice hockey forward who played in the National Hockey League (NHL) and in European leagues.

Playing career
Undrafted, Motzko played for St. Cloud State University in the Western Collegiate Hockey Association. After his senior year with St. Cloud, Motzko was signed by the Columbus Blue Jackets on May 15, 2003. He was then sent to join its affiliate, the Syracuse Crunch of the American Hockey League.

In the 2003–04 season, his first full professional season, Motzko appeared in his first NHL game with the Blue Jackets on February 2, 2004, against the Phoenix Coyotes.

In his fourth season with the Blue Jackets, mainly spent with the Syracuse Crunch, Motzko was traded by the Blue Jackets along with Mark Hartigan to the Anaheim Ducks for Curtis Glencross and Zenon Konopka on January 26, 2007. Ten days earlier, Motzko scored his first career NHL goal at the United Center in Chicago against Nikolai Khabibulin and the Chicago Blackhawks in a 5-4 Blue Jackets victory.  Motzko was then assigned to the Portland Pirates before he was called up to the Ducks during the 2007 playoffs. Motzko appeared in 3 post-season games for the Stanley Cup-winning Ducks.

On July 9, 2007, Motzko was signed by the Washington Capitals. He appeared in 8 games with the Capitals (in his Capitals debut, he had 3 points scoring 2 goals and one assist) before he was traded to the Atlanta Thrashers for Alexandre Giroux on February 26, 2008. Motzko was assigned to the Thrashers affiliate, the Chicago Wolves, where he won the 2008 Calder Cup Championship. Motzko made his Thrashers debut in the 2008–09 season on January 31, 2009, in a 2-0 loss to the Carolina Hurricanes.

On July 16, 2009, Motzko signed with Russian team HC MVD of the Kontinental Hockey League. However, before ever appearing in a game with MVD, Motzko was released on September 11, and four days later signed with ERC Ingolstadt of the Deutsche Eishockey Liga.

After four seasons with Ingolstadt, Motzko left as a free agent and joined neighbouring league in Austria on a one-year deal with EC Red Bull Salzburg of the EBEL on June 26, 2013.

Career statistics

Awards and achievements
1997-98 MSHSL Mr. Hockey Semifinalist (Bemidji High School)
1999-00 WCHA Rookie of the Week (St. Cloud State)
2000-01 WCHA Broadmoor Trophy (St. Cloud State)
2006–07 NHL Stanley Cup (Anaheim Ducks)
2007–08 AHL Calder Cup (Chicago Wolves)
2010 Bemidji High School Athletic Hall of Fame

References

External links

1980 births
Living people
People from Bemidji, Minnesota
American men's ice hockey right wingers
Anaheim Ducks players
Atlanta Thrashers players
Chicago Wolves players
Columbus Blue Jackets players
ERC Ingolstadt players
Hershey Bears players
Portland Pirates players
Ritten Sport players
EC Red Bull Salzburg players
Stanley Cup champions
Syracuse Crunch players
Undrafted National Hockey League players
Washington Capitals players
Ice hockey players from Minnesota